Makan Dembélé (25 December 1986) is a Malian footballer who plays for USFAS Bamako in Malian Première Division.

Club career
On January 1, 2012, Dembélé signed for Algerian club JS Kabylie. On January 31, 2012, he made his debut for the club as a 77th-minute substitute in a league game against CA Batna.

References

1986 births
Algerian Ligue Professionnelle 1 players
Expatriate footballers in Algeria
Expatriate footballers in Iran
JS Kabylie players
Living people
Malian footballers
Malian expatriate sportspeople in Algeria
Malian expatriate footballers
Sportspeople from Bamako
Association football forwards
21st-century Malian people